George Brock (born 7 November 1951) is a professor of journalism at City, University of London. He held the position of head of department from September 2009 to September 2014.

Career
After beginning his career in 1973 as a reporter for the Yorkshire Evening Press, Brock was a journalist for The Observer (1976–1981) and The Times (1981–2008), where he held positions from foreign correspondent to managing editor.

Other responsibilities
Brock has been President of the World Editors Forum (2004–2008) where he still sits as a board member. He was also a member of the board for The Times Newspapers Ltd (1997–2004) and has frequently written for papers in the US, Poland, Sweden and Timbuktu.

Books

External links

References

1951 births
Living people
English editors
Academics of City, University of London
Alumni of Corpus Christi College, Oxford